Tucking is a technique whereby an individual hides the crotch bulge of the penis and testicles so that they are not conspicuous through clothing.

The practice is most commonly employed by transgender women, as well as non-binary people who were assigned male at birth and men who do drag, or otherwise desire a more androgynous appearance. There are fertility-related side-effects to tucking, such as a reduced sperm count. Some types of clothing, such as gaffs and boxers are purposefully designed to conceal the crotch bulge.

Methods 
One method of tucking involves pulling the penis backwards in between the legs while simultaneously pushing the testicles up into the inguinal canal. In order to secure this position in place, some practitioners may use especially tight undergarments and a leotard that has a strap. Another practice is the flattening or binding by using tape to fasten the genitalia along the perineum and if possible in between the buttocks. There are also improvised or home-made contrivances whereby an elastic waistband is cut off from an existing garment and then a pouch placed along the middle to then be pulled up.

Some people use purpose-made panty-like garments, often called gaffs, that serve to hide the genitalia and provide a feminine flat and smooth crotch area.

Other 
The practice of tucking is also observed among cisgender men for reasons other than appearing female, done in different manners. Some cisgender men do it because they have dysmorphophobia with regards to their genital bulge. For other men it is due to feeling embarrassment, while others do it to hide an erection, to desexualize themselves out of a sense of prudishness or phallophobia or because the bulge is prominent at an inappropriate moment. Methods of tucking include placing the penis behind the waistband sometimes colloquially referred to as uptuck while some men may wear purposefully designed compressing underwear. Variations of tucking may be used by macrophallic men when they perceive their crotch bulge to have an obscene appearance. There are some types of boxer shorts and boxer briefs that are designed to conceal the male crotch bulge, such as bloxers.

References

Cross-dressing
Gender transitioning
Trans women
Human appearance
Body shape
Penis